Visitors to Japan must obtain a visa from one of the Japanese diplomatic missions, unless they come from one of the visa-exempt countries.

Visa policy map

Visa exemption

 
Holders of ordinary passports of the following jurisdictions do not need a visa to stay in Japan for up to 90 days (unless otherwise noted):

Diplomatic and official passports

Holders of diplomatic and official passports of the following countries do not need a visa for Japan, and are granted the status of residence as diplomats or officials:

Holders of diplomatic and official passports of other countries to whom a visa exemption applies when using an ordinary passport are also exempted from a visa, but are granted the status of residence as temporary visitors under the same conditions and maximum stay as with an ordinary passport. This exemption does not apply to holders of diplomatic and official passports of Taiwan, and to those of the United States traveling for official purposes.

APEC Business Travel Card
Holders of passports of the following jurisdictions who also hold an APEC Business Travel Card (ABTC) containing the code "JPN" on the reverse may travel to Japan without a visa for business purposes for stays of up to 90 days:

History
Japan had a special visa policy for nationals of countries of the Commonwealth of Independent States who could not provide their financial guarantees and get a visa on their own but instead they had to apply through an approved travel agency or be invited by a resident or a citizen of Japan. These requirements were lifted for citizens of Russia on 1 January 2017, Georgia, Kazakhstan, Kyrgyzstan, Tajikistan, Turkmenistan and Uzbekistan on 5 June 2017, Armenia on 1 September 2017, Azerbaijan on 1 December 2017 and Belarus, Moldova and Ukraine on 1 January 2018.

In addition, the Ministry of Foreign Affairs of Japan has special visa policies for nationals of China and the Philippines. Nationals of these countries also must apply through an accredited travel agent or be invited by a Japanese citizen or a resident of Japan.

As of 2014, nationals of the Philippines and Vietnam travelling in a group through a registered travel agency may obtain entry visas for tourist visits up to 15 days in a simplified process that requires fewer documents than before. Moreover, nationals of India, the Philippines and Vietnam can obtain multiple-entry visas providing that they have visited Japan and other G7 countries or they have "sufficient financial capability".

As of 2015, Chinese tourists travelling on approved cruise ships do not need a visa. They must embark and disembark the same specified ships.

Japan was reportedly set to ease visa requirements for visitors from key markets, such as India, China and Vietnam, starting in the summer of 2016. A new wave of visa liberalization policies started on 17 October 2016 for Chinese nationals and on 1 January 2018 for Indian nationals.

Due to the COVID-19 pandemic, Japan suspended the visa exemptions for most countries from March 2020, and later for all countries, and restored them on 11 October 2022.

Statistics
In 2015 4,768,286 Japanese visas were issued. It is an increase of 66% from 2014 when 2,871,639 visas were issued and the highest number ever recorded.

Most visas were applied for by nationals of the following countries:

Most visitors arriving to Japan were from the following countries of nationality:
In 2015 most visas were issued for group sightseeing (1,957,498) and individual sightseeing (1,126,209). There were 62,052 multiple-entry visas for Okinawa and 10,500 multiple-entry visas for three prefectures in Tōhoku.

Re-entry Permit as a Visa

Those who are traveling outside Japan for longer than 1 year are required to have a re-entry permit. Normally, the re-entry permit will be applied to a passport in the form of a self-adhesive sticker. For those who do not have a valid passport, a booklet type Re-entry Permit will be issued at the same time as the re-entry Permit stamp issues.

In the new system as of July 2012, the maximum period for a re-entry permit is 6 years.

Special Re-entry Permit
From July 9, 2012, foreign nationals residing legally in Japan who are leaving Japan for no more than 1 year will not be required to apply for a re-entry permit prior to leaving, but can instead apply for a special re-entry permit at the point of departure. Previously if a foreign national left Japan without a re-entry permit, their visa or legal residency status could be revoked.

The special re-entry permit system does not apply to those falling under any of the following.

 those whose resident status is in the process of revocation
 those whose confirmation of departure is suspended
 those who have received a written detention order
 those who are in the process of a refugee application and staying with the resident status of "Designated Activities"
 those who are specified by Japan's Ministry of Justice to be a threat to Japan's national interests or public order, or for other good reasons to be in need of a re-entry permit for the sake of fair control of entries and departures

The special re-entry permit is not available for booklet type Re-entry Permit holders and they must have a stamp type re-entry permit on their booklet since the valid date of the booklet Re-entry Permit is limited to the stamp.

Admission refused
As a result of sanctions against North Korea, entry and transit is refused to  nationals, even if not leaving the aircraft and proceeding by the same flight.

See also

Visa requirements for Japanese citizens

Notes

References

External links
List of Countries and Regions That Have Visa Exemption Arrangements with Japan (68 countries and regions as of July 2017)
List of Japanese diplomatic missions
MOFA visa instructions
Japan Visa Types

Japan
Foreign relations of Japan